The Big Gum Swamp Wilderness is located in the Osceola National Forest, northeast of Lake City, Florida. The  refuge was established on September 28, 1984.

External links
 Big Gum Swamp Wilderness at Wildernet
 Big Gum Swamp Wilderness - official site at Osceola National Forest

Protected areas of Baker County, Florida
Protected areas of Columbia County, Florida
IUCN Category Ib
Wilderness areas of Florida
Osceola National Forest
Protected areas established in 1984
1984 establishments in Florida